The Cornell University Board of Trustees is the board of trustees for Cornell University, a private, Ivy League university located in Ithaca, New York. The board is vested with "supreme control" over the entire university, in accordance to university bylaws. The board's major responsibilities are to establish the degrees that are awarded by the university, elect the president, and adopt an annual plan of financial operation. Day-to-day administration has been delegated by the trustees to the president. There are 64 voting members on the board, including students, employees, faculty, and alumni that are voted onto the board by their respective group. The four ex officio members of the board are the president of the university, the governor of the state of New York, the speaker of the state assembly, and the president of the state senate. The current chairman of the board is Robert Harrison.

Chairmen of the board
Ezra Cornell 1866-1874
Henry W. Sage 1875-1897
Roswell P. Flower 1897-1899
None 1899-1917
Frank H. Hiscock 1917-1939
J. DuPratt White 1939
Howard Edward Babcock 1940-1947
Neal Dow Becker 1947-1953
John Lyon Collyer 1953-1959
Arthur H. Dean 1959-1968
Robert W. Purcell 1968-1978
Jansen Noyes, Jr. 1978-1984
Austin H. Kiplinger 1984-1989
Stephen H. Weiss 1989-1997
Harold Tanner 1997-2002
Peter C. Meinig 2002-2011
Robert Harrison 2012-present

References
Cornell Board of Trustees

Cornell University people